Madej is a surname. Notable people with this surname include:

 Łukasz Madej (born 1982), Polish footballer
 Shane Madej (born 1986), American writer and producer

See also
 

Polish-language surnames